Zhong Man (born February 28, 1983, in Nantong, Jiangsu) is a Chinese sabre fencer, who competed at the 2008 Summer Olympics, winning the second ever gold medal for China in fencing. During the 07/08 season, he was ranked number 2 in the world.

See also
 China at the 2008 Summer Olympics

References

External links
 Zhong Man on fie.ch

1983 births
Living people
Chinese male fencers
Fencers at the 2008 Summer Olympics
Fencers at the 2012 Summer Olympics
Olympic fencers of China
Olympic gold medalists for China
Sportspeople from Nantong
Fencers from Jiangsu
Asian Games medalists in fencing
Fencers at the 2010 Asian Games
Medalists at the 2008 Summer Olympics
Asian Games gold medalists for China
Asian Games silver medalists for China
Medalists at the 2010 Asian Games
Universiade medalists in fencing
Nanjing Sport Institute alumni
Universiade gold medalists for China
Universiade bronze medalists for China
Olympic medalists in fencing
Medalists at the 2009 Summer Universiade